A130, A.130 or A-130 may refer to:
 A130 road (England), a major road connecting Little Waltham near Chelmsford to Canvey Island in Essex
 Russian route A130, a highway in Russia
 Aero A.130, a prototype of 1920s Czechoslovakian A.30 biplane light bomber and reconnaissance aircraft
 OMB Circular A-130, a circular produced by the U.S. Federal Government to establish policy for executive branch departments and agencies
 RFA Gold Ranger (A130), a tanker which served in the British Royal Fleet Auxiliary in World War 2